Sauer Lake is a lake in Alberta.

Sauer Lake
Parkland County